Selvasaura almendarizae, Almendáriz's microtegu, occurs in Ecuador.

References
  

Selvasaura
Reptiles described in 2021